The following is a list of notable alumni of Cranbrook Kingswood School and its predecessors, Cranbrook School for Boys and Kingswood School for Girls.

1930s
William Talman (1932), actor
Florence Knoll (1934), designer; former head of Knoll
Bob Bemer (1936), computer pioneer; co-inventor of ASCII; named COBOL
William Henry Scott (1939), historian

1940s
Natalie Zemon Davis (1945), historian
Barbara Lea (1947), singer
Daniel Ellsberg (1948), leaker of the Pentagon Papers

1950s
Alan K. Simpson (1950), U.S. Senator (R-Wyoming), 1979–1997
Ward Just (1953), author
Ivan Boesky (Class of 1955 but left prior to senior year), arbitrageur; convicted felon; an inspiration for character Gordon Gekko in the film Wall Street
Pete Dawkins (1955), Heisman Trophy winner, Rhodes Scholar; former Army Brigadier General; former Vice Chairman of Citigroup Private Bank
Martha Henry (1955), American-Canadian actress
Thomas McGuane (1958), writer, essayist
Edmund White III (1958), author
Raymond Sokolov (1959), journalist

1960s
Joel E. Cohen (1961), mathematical biologist
Tod Williams (1961), architect
Michael Barone (1962), pundit and political commentator
Rich Gibson (1963), Marxist Professor Emeritus, Author
Charles Bigelow (1963), type designer; former professor of digital typography at Stanford University; co-designer of Lucida family of typefaces
Taro Yamasaki (1964), Pulitzer Prize winner for photojournalism
Mitt Romney (1965), U.S. Senator from Utah; former governor of Massachusetts; Republican Party nominee for President of the United States in 2012
Mary Fisher (1966), founder of Family AIDS Network; speaker at the 1992 Republican National Convention; daughter of businessman and philanthropist Max Fisher
Ann Romney (1967), wife of Mitt Romney (1965)
Cynthia Grissom Efird (1967), U.S. ambassador to Angola from 2004 to 2007
Reed Slatkin (1967), co-founder of EarthLink; convicted felon
Bing Gordon (1968), Chief Creative Officer, Electronic Arts
Michael Kinsley (1968), journalist; commentator; founder of Slate; former editorial page editor of the Los Angeles Times
Sorayouth Prompoj (1968), diplomat; Thai Ambassador to Germany
Sven Birkerts (1969), author

1970s
Kathryn Kolbert (1970), civil rights lawyer; former president of People For the American Way
Brad Leithauser (1971), author
Henry Tang (1971), former Chief Secretary for Administration of Hong Kong
Scott McNealy (1972), CEO of Sun Microsystems
Kenneth Dart (1972), venture capitalist, investor; co-owner of Dart Container
Lisa Frank (1972), founder of Lisa Frank Inc.
Dey Young (1973), actress
Michael Eric Dyson (Class of 1976 but left after 2 years; did not graduate), author and radio host
Dan Dickerson (1976), radio play-by-play announcer for the Detroit Tigers
Bill Prady (1977), television writer and producer (The Muppets, Dharma & Greg, The Big Bang Theory)
Jennifer Clement (1978), writer and President of PEN International
Douglas Sills (1978), actor
David Trott (1978), U.S. representative for Michigan's 11th congressional district 2015 - 2019
Amy Denio (1979), musician
Bob Woodruff (1979), co-anchor of ABC World News Tonight

1980s
Rob Edwards (1981), television and feature film screenwriter and producer
Robbie Buhl (1982), racecar driver
Tim Westergren (1984), founder of Pandora Radio; included in TIME Magazine’s 2010 list of the 100 Most Influential People in the World
Eric Fanning (class of 1986, left prior to graduation), 22nd Secretary of the Army
Brad Keywell (1987), managing partner and co-founder of Lightbank; co-founder and Director of Groupon, Mediaocean, and Echo Global Logistics
Ronald Machen (1987), United States Attorney for the District of Columbia
Jay Adelson (1988), former CEO of Digg
Glenn Kessler (1988), screenwriter and television producer (Damages)
Alexi Lalas (1988), professional soccer player; played in the 1992 Summer Olympics and 1994 World Cup; National Soccer Hall of Fame
Renée Elise Goldsberry (1989), actress (Hamilton; Ally McBeal)
Ari Schwartz (1989), former Senior Director for Cybersecurity on the United States National Security Council Staff at the White House

1990s
Elizabeth Berkley (Class of 1990 but left prior to senior year), actress
Selma Blair (1990), actress
Todd A. Kessler (1990), screenwriter, television producer, and director
Elissa Slotkin (1994), American politician and former CIA analyst serving as the U.S. representative for Michigan's 8th congressional district since 2019
Jay Penske (Class of 1997, left prior to senior year), media and publishing entrepreneur; owner of WWD, Fairchild Publications, Variety Magazine, and other media brands
Jaime Ray Newman (1996), actress

2000s
Jamie Hodari (2000), Co-founder and CEO of Industrious
Ivan Krstić (2004), IT security engineer
 Brett Tremain (2004), Co-Founder of investment bank Ancoris Capital Partners
Casey Wellman (2006), professional hockey player (NHL)
Andrew Miller (2007), professional hockey player (NHL)
Patrick Brown (2010), professional hockey player (NHL)
Lauren Withrow (2015), sports reporter for ESPN+ and Sports Illustrated

References

 01
Cranbrook Kingswood School alumni
Kingswood School
Cranbrook Kingswood School
Cranbrook Kingswood School alumni